Kiss Me Goodnight, Sergeant Major  is a World War II soldier's song. Roud 16962.  The final line is "Sgt. Major, be a mother to me". The song is normally credited to Art Noel and Don Pelosi in 1939. There was a follow-up: "Good Morning Sergeant Major" (circa 1940).

External links
Drinking songs

See also 1939 in music

British songs
1939 songs
Songs of World War II
Max Bygraves songs